Maksim Grek (born 25 May 1993) is a Kazakhstani professional footballer, who also holds Russian citizenship.

Career

Club
On 19 February 2021, FK Khujand announced the signing of Grek.

References

External links 
 
 

1993 births
Living people
Kazakhstani footballers
Russian footballers
Association football defenders
Kazakhstani expatriate footballers
Expatriate footballers in Latvia
Expatriate footballers in Belarus
Expatriate footballers in Tajikistan
FC Khimki players
FC Ordabasy players
FC Bayterek players
BFC Daugavpils players
FC Belshina Bobruisk players
FK Khujand players